Leiopus nebulosus is a species of longhorn beetle of the subfamily Lamiinae. It was described by Carl Linnaeus in his landmark 1758 10th edition of Systema Naturae. It contains two subspecies; the first, L. nebulosus nebulosus, is known from Europe and Russia, and the second, L. nebulosus caucasicus, is endemic to the mountains of the Caucasus (from which its species epithet is derived). The beetles inhabit deciduous trees, including those in the genera Fagus, Quercus, Carpinus, Juglans, Acer, Ulmus, Betula, Salix, and Prunus. They measure 5–10 millimetres in length, and can live for approximately 1–2 years.

Subspecies
 Leiopus nebulosus nebulosus (Linnaeus, 1758)
 Leiopus nebulosus caucasicus Ganglbauer, 1887

References

Beetles described in 1758
Taxa named by Carl Linnaeus
Acanthocinini